KTMP (1340 AM) is a radio station broadcasting a classic hits format. Licensed to Heber City, Utah, United States, the station is currently owned by Doug and Marianne Barton, through licensee Sanpete County Broadcasting Co.

History
The station was assigned the call letters KLVR on July 27, 1981. On May 16, 1986, the station changed its call sign to the current KTMP.

References

External links

TMP
Country radio stations in the United States
Radio stations established in 1981
1981 establishments in Utah